Bucca may refer to:

 Bucca (mythological creature), a mythological creature of Cornish origin
 Bucca, pioneering Cornish folk group
 Bucca, seventh-century founder of Buckingham
 Bucca, Queensland, a locality in the Bundaberg Region, Queensland, Australia
 Camp Bucca, a U.S. military prison camp in Iraq
 Cheek, Latin term being bucca

People with the surname
Ronald Paul Bucca, a New York City fire marshal killed during the September 11, 2001, terrorist attacks